The Piedmont Driving Club is a private social club with two club houses in Atlanta, Georgia.

Founded in 1887 originally as the Gentlemen's Driving Club, the name reflected the interest of the members to "drive" their horse and carriages on the club grounds. The club later briefly used the adjacent grounds as a golf course until it sold the land to the city in 1904 to create Piedmont Park. The club admitted its first black member in 1994.

The club's facilities include golf, tennis, platform tennis, squash, swimming, exercise facilities, massage, casual and fine dining, and event space for larger gatherings. In May 2000, the club built a Rees Jones-designed 18-hole championship golf course and executive par-3 course several miles from the main clubhouse on Camp Creek Parkway. In 2014, the club hosted one of two 2014 US Amateur Qualifier golf tournaments in Georgia. In 2018, it also hosted the Georgia Mid-Amateur Championship.

From July 2008 through December 2009, it underwent a renovation to its informal dining and athletic facilities.  The squash program was expanded to include two international hardball doubles courts and two international singles courts. The club hosted the annual cross-border, US versus Canada, Lapham Grant competition for the second time in 2012. The club also serves as one of several host venues for the Peachtree Invitational  platform tennis tournament.

See also
 List of American gentlemen's clubs

References

1887 establishments in Georgia (U.S. state)
Golf clubs and courses in Georgia (U.S. state)
Squash venues in the United States
Sports venues in Atlanta
Gentlemen's clubs in the United States
Sports clubs established in 1887